Aljaž Antolin (born 2 August 2002) is a Slovenian football midfielder who plays for Slovenian PrvaLiga side Maribor.

Career
Antolin started his youth career at hometown club Ižakovci, and later played for Beltinci. In 2010, he moved to Mura 05 and joined the club's under-10 team. After Mura 05 went bankrupt in 2013, he transferred to the newly established phoenix club NŠ Mura.

On 11 February 2021, Antolin made his professional debut for Mura in the Slovenian PrvaLiga in a goalless draw against Tabor Sežana. Overall, he made three league appearances during the 2020–21 season, and also won the league title with the club.

On 16 July 2021, Antolin joined Maribor on a four-year contract. In August, he was sent on loan to the Slovenian Second League side Beltinci. After making 13 appearances and scoring 4 goals for Beltinci in the first half of the season, he returned to Maribor for the second half of the season and made his debut on 21 February 2022 in a 4–1 league win over Radomlje.

Honours
Mura
Slovenian PrvaLiga: 2020–21

Maribor
Slovenian PrvaLiga: 2021–22

References

2002 births
Living people
People from Murska Sobota
Slovenian footballers
Slovenia under-21 international footballers
Association football midfielders
NŠ Mura players
NK Maribor players
Slovenian PrvaLiga players
Slovenian Second League players